Alexei (also Aleksei, Alexey, Aleksey) L. Semenov (also Semyonov, Semёnov) (Russian: Алексей Львович Семенов; born 1950) is a Russian mathematician, educationalist, Academician of the Russian Academy of Sciences, Academician of the Russian Academy of Education, Head of the Department of Mathematical Logic and Theory of Algorithms, Lomonosov State University, Professor, Dr. Sc.

Early Life and Education 

Alexei Semenov was born in 1950 in Moscow to a family of electronic and computer engineers. He graduated from Moscow school No. 7 and the Faculty of Mechanics and Mathematics of Lomonosov Moscow State University (1972). He completed Candidate of Sciences in Physics and Mathematics degree (Moscow State University, 1975, scientific advisor ― Albert Muchnik, dissertation «On definability in some decidable theories»), Doctor of Sciences in Physics and Mathematics degree (Steklov Institute of Mathematics, 1984, dissertation «Logical Theories of One-place Functions on Integers»).

Career and Research 

Semenov conducted his research in the field of mathematical logic, cybernetics, theoretical computer science, artificial intelligence, education.

Mathematics 

His major field in mathematical logic is definability theory. He is known for his decidability results, Cobham – Semenov Theorem, symbolic dynamics applications, lattices of definability descriptions. His student Andrey Muchnik solved Michael O. Rabin problem, posed at International Congress of Mathematicians in Nice. Muchnik and Semenov solved a problem of Andrey Kolmogorov from his work originated descriptive complexity theory. He contributed also to the foundations of the theory of algorithms and theory of randomness.

Among other his students are Alexei Lisitsa, Yuri Pritykin, Tatyana Starikovskaya and Vladimir Vovk.

Computing and AI 
Semenov started work in practical computing at age 14 in cooperation with his mother, specifically in speech recognition in the group of Dmitry Pospelov. He participated in the last Soviet attempt to construct a supercomputer in 1986. In the last years he developed a concept of individual extended by digital instruments and media. The concept elaborates vision of Lev Vygotsky, Josef M. Feigenberg, Sherry Turkle, Andy Clark and Michel Serres to the educational context of mass school.

Education: Theory and Implementation 
Alexei Semenov’s theoretical and practical work in education originated in his involvement as a student, and later, as a teacher in the Nikolay Konstantinov’s math schools. His educational philosophy is rooted in “learning-by-doing (mathematics ao)” of Robert Lee Moore and Paul Halmos and Russian mathematical circles constructionist approach of Seymour Papert, see also of London Knowledge Lab.

Prof. Semenov's approach to learning and teaching math and computer science in primary school is based on Inquiry-based learning, mathematical experimenting by learners, language development, emphasizing visual (on screen and paper) and palpable (manipulatives, moving objects) environments of strings, bags, tables, games, and robots as the basis for all math, including, but not limited by, numerical (arithmetic); priority of solving problems-not-known-how-to-solve over drill-and-practice, using computer for all routine tasks.

In 1985 he was the organizer and co-author of the first computer science textbook for all Soviet schools (editor and co-author – academician A. P. Ershov). Later he was the leader of the authors' teams for textbooks in mathematics and computer science for primary and secondary schools.

In 1987 following his work in the Academy of Sciences he originated a not-for-profit Institute of New Technologies (INT), that introduced the constructionist philosophy into Russian schools and started cooperation of INT and other Russian educators with Papert's group at MIT Media Lab, Blagovest Sendov's Problem Group on Education at Bulgarian Academy of Sciences, Robert Tinker's group at TERC, LCSI, Key Curriculum Press. So INT produced Russian adaptations, learning and teaching materials for Logo, educational LEGO, Geometer’s Sketchpad, etc.

Semenov initiated and led in cooperation with Sergey Soprunov the project of Logo-style learning environment for pre-literacy pre-numeracy children, recogized by S. Papert in his book "The Connected Family".

In 2017–2019 he led design and implementation for a system of resultative education (personalized competence-based learning) for Russian schools.

In 2019 Alexei Semenov organized a 3 year Program «Fundamental Scientific Support for the Digitalization of General Education» in Russian Foundation for Fundamental Research. As a result of the expert selection, 62 teams from 12 regions of Russia received financial support. "Charter for the Digital Way of School" (2021) is one of the outcomes created as part of the work on the program  as a result of a dialogue between the participants of the Program and other prominent figures of Russian education.

In 2021 he started a Master's Program at Moscow State University on AI and Digital Technologies. In 2022 he reorganized the basic undergraduate course on Mathematical logic and theory of algorithms as a copletely problem-solvibg course in the style of Paul Halmos.

In 2022 Alexei Semenov became the leader of compiling the New Russian Mathematical Encyclopedia as a source for digital Great Russian Encyclopedia, where he became a vice-chairman.

In 2022–2023 he initiated a project of primary school meta-subject "Future World". In all school subjects students are introduced to the future by doing its pieces now in such modules like "Introduction" (children to each other, to the teacher, the tablet, and network), "Organization" (keeping myself in time), "Communication" (video-aidio-text, as recording the first memory of the eldest in the family), etc.

Teaching and Research Positions 
Taught at the Moscow school №7, Andrey Kolmogorov boarding school at Lomonosov Moscow State University and at the Department of Mathematical Logic Faculty of Mechanics and Mathematics at Lomonosov Moscow State University.

President and CEO (Rector) of the Moscow Institute of Open Education (1993–2013) which was responsible for the professional development, in-service training, guidance and consulting of all 100,000 Moscow teachers. In 2002 he recreated School No. 179 and returned the mathematician and teacher Nikolay Konstantinov to work there.

President and CEO (Rector) of the Moscow State Pedagogical University (2013–2016) – the leading teacher-training institution in the country.

Director of Axel Berg Institute of Cybernetics and Educational Computing FRC CSC Russian Academy of Sciences (2015 – now).

Head of the Department of Mathematical Logic and Theory of Algorithms MSU Faculty of Mechanics and Mathematics (2018 – now). 

Senior expert at the Institute of Education of Higher School of Economics (Moscow) (2017 – now).

Editor-in-Chief of the «Kvant magazine» (2012–2018). Editor-in-Chief of the journal Doklady Mathematics (from 2021). Served as invited editor to volumes of  Theoretical Computer Science and MDPI – Mathematics (2022, 2023), see List of MDPI academic journals.

Author of over 200 scientific papers in mathematics, computer science and education.

International Activities 
Alexei Semenov participated in numerous international activities of mathematical and ICT educators.

Alexei Semenov's vision was supported and disseminated by UNESCO with the help of recommendations for primary education as well as for general education. Later he participated in the teams led by Ivan Kalaš, that created recommendations for preschool education and primary education. He participated in the creation of UNESCO recommendations on ICT for teacher education. Prof. Alexei Semenov's activities and influence were recognized by UNESCO Prize on ICT in Education.

Alexei Semenov was the national coordinator of Second Information Technology in Education Study: SITES 2006, member of International Task Force on Teachers for Education 2030, etc.

In 1989 he initiated and played a critical role in the return of international organization on technologies in education ORT (originated in StPetersburg in 1880) into USSR and Central Europe, serves as a member of Board of Trustees and co-chair of Academic Advisory Council of the organization.

In 2007–2009 he served as a member of the Executive Committee of the International Commission on Mathematical Instruction.

Awards and Honours 
 Academician of the Russian Academy of Sciences in the Division of Mathematical Sciences (since 2011).
 Academician of the Russian Academy of Education (since 2010).
 UNESCO – King Hamad Bin Isa Al-Khalifa Prize in 2009 – for the application of information and communication technologies in education. 
 A. N. Kolmogorov Prize in 2006 – for outstanding achievements in the field of mathematics  for the series of works «On the refinement of A.N. Kolmogorov, related to the theory of chance».
 The President of the Russian Federation Award in the field of education in 1998 – headed the team for the development and implementation of a comprehensive program for informatization of education in the Moscow region.
 Russian Federation Government Prize in the field of education in 2009 – for the development of the project «Informatization of the education system of the Russian Federation». The prize was awarded by the order of the Government of the Russian Federation of 28.08.2009 No. 1246-r.

Personal life 
His wife is E. I. Bulin–Sokolova, a graduate of the Moscow State University, an educator, Doctor of pedagogical Sciences. Children: with Galina Sheina: Maria Possitselskaya (1974) – teacher, author of math textbooks for elementary school, Daria Semenova (1979) – singer, teacher, author of music textbooks, with Tatiana Rudchenko: Mikhail Semenov (1992) – startup entrepreneur, with E. I. Bulin-Sokolova: Marfa Bulin-Sokolova (1994) –  architectural designer, Fedor Bulin-Sokolov (1995) – financial analyst, Anna Semenova (1999) – psychologist, Nikolay Semenov (2001) – photographer, Andrey Semenov (2004) – fashion model and software developer, Ivan Semenov – high school student. Grandchildren: Alexandra Semenova – linguist, Ekaterina Possitselsky – molecular biologist, Dmitry, Anastasiya, Grigory, Timothey, Kirill – students, Olga – preschool.

A big role in the life of A. L. Semenov was played by a meeting in 1979 with Jana Ryšlinková and subsequent relations with her.

References

External links 
 
 
  Source: 
 
 
 

 Alexei Semenov — personal page on ISTINA MSU
 Alexei Semenov — personal page on Math-Net.ru
 Alexei Semenov — personal page on GoogleScholar

Russian mathematicians
Russian computer scientists
Living people
Moscow State University alumni
Academic staff of Moscow State University
Soviet mathematicians
Soviet computer scientists
1950 births